Thomas Richardson (April 14, 1905 - death date unknown) was an American baseball pitcher in the Negro leagues. He played with several clubs from 1930 to 1934.  
His career is sometimes combined with Henry Richardson.

References

External links
 and Baseball-Reference Black Baseball stats and Seamheads

Baltimore Black Sox players
Cuban House of David players
Philadelphia Stars players
Washington Pilots players
1905 births
Year of death missing
Baseball pitchers